Austrosciapus is a genus of flies in the family Dolichopodidae. It is mainly found in Australia, though some species are also known from New Zealand, French Polynesia, Norfolk Island and the Hawaiian Islands.

Gallery

Species

 Austrosciapus actensis Bickel, 1994
 Austrosciapus aprilis Bickel, 1994
 Austrosciapus ascitus Bickel, 1994
 Austrosciapus balli Bickel, 1994
 Austrosciapus bifarius (Becker, 1922)
 Austrosciapus broulensis Bickel, 1994
 Austrosciapus cantrelli Bickel, 1994
 Austrosciapus capricornis Bickel, 1994
 Austrosciapus cassisi Bickel, 1994
 Austrosciapus collessi Bickel, 1994
 Austrosciapus connexus (Walker, 1835)
 Austrosciapus crater Bickel, 1994
 Austrosciapus dayi Bickel, 1994
 Austrosciapus dekeyzeri Bickel, 1994
 Austrosciapus dendrohalma Bickel, 1994
 Austrosciapus discretifasciatus (Macquart, 1850)
 Austrosciapus doddi Bickel, 1994
 Austrosciapus flavicauda Bickel, 1994
 Austrosciapus frauci Bickel, 1994
 Austrosciapus fraudulosus Bickel, 1994
 Austrosciapus gwynnae Bickel, 1994
 Austrosciapus hollowayi Bickel, 1994
 Austrosciapus janae Bickel, 1994
 Austrosciapus kuborensis Bickel in Bickel & Martin, 2016
 Austrosciapus magus Bickel, 1994
 Austrosciapus minnamurra Bickel, 1994
 Austrosciapus muelleri Bickel, 1994
 Austrosciapus nellae Bickel, 1994
 Austrosciapus otfordensis Bickel, 1994
 Austrosciapus proximus (Parent, 1928)
 Austrosciapus pseudotumidus Bickel, 1994
 Austrosciapus pulvillus Bickel, 1994
 Austrosciapus quadrimaculatus (Parent, 1932)
 Austrosciapus ravenshoensis Bickel, 1994
 Austrosciapus riparius Bickel, 1994
 Austrosciapus sarinensis Bickel, 1994
 Austrosciapus solus Bickel, 1994
 Austrosciapus stevensi Bickel, 1994
 Austrosciapus storeyi Bickel, 1994
 Austrosciapus tooloomensis Bickel, 1994
 Austrosciapus triangulifer (Becker, 1922)
 Austrosciapus tumidus (Hardy, 1958)
 Austrosciapus zentae Bickel, 1994

References 

Dolichopodidae genera
Sciapodinae
Insects of Australia
Diptera of Australasia